"From Small Things (Big Things One Day Come)" is a rock song originally written and performed by American singer and songwriter Bruce Springsteen. It was recorded in 1979 during The River sessions, but it was not released on the album. Springsteen's version was included on the 2003 bonus disc of The Essential Bruce Springsteen, and in 2015 on the box set The Ties That Bind: The River Collection.

The song was covered by Dave Edmunds in 1982, and his version of the song peaked at position 28 on the Billboard Rock Chart, released on  Edmund’s album, D.E. 7th.

References

1979 songs
Bruce Springsteen songs
Songs written by Bruce Springsteen
Dave Edmunds songs
1982 singles